Verbascoside is a caffeoyl phenylethanoid glycoside in which the phenylpropanoid caffeic acid and the phenylethanoid hydroxytyrosol form an ester and an ether bond respectively, to the rhamnose part of a disaccharide, namely β-(3′,4′-dihydroxyphenyl)ethyl-O-α-L-rhamnopyranosyl(1→3)-β-D-(4-O-caffeoyl)-glucopyranoside.

Occurrences

Natural occurrences 
Verbascoside can be found in species in all the families of the order Lamiales (syn. Scrophulariales). Only two examples are known from outside the order, in the clade Asterids.

 in the Lamiales
In the family Lamiaceae, it can be found in the medicinal plants in the genus Phlomis, in the Scrophulariaceae, in Verbascum phlomoides, Verbascum mallophorum, or, in the family Buddlejaceae, in Buddleja globosa or Buddleja cordata, in the family Bignoniaceae, in Pithecoctenium sp and Tynanthus panurensis, in the family Orobanchaceae, in Cistanche sp and Orobanche rapum-genistae, in the Plantaginaceae, in Plantago lanceolata, in Verbenaceae, in Verbena officinalis (common vervain), Aloysia citrodora (lemon verbena) and Lantana camara, in the Oleaceae, in Olea europaea (olive), in the Lentibulariaceae, in the carnivorous plant Pinguicula lusitanica, and, in the Byblidaceae, in Byblis liniflora.

Derivatives 
Verbascoside derivatives can be found in the Verbascum undulatum and notably apiosides in Verbascum sp.

In in vitro cultures 
It can also be produced in plant cell cultures of Leucosceptrum sp (Lamiaceae) and Syringa sp (Oleaceae). It can also be produced in hairy roots cultures of Paulownia tomentosa (empress tree, Paulowniaceae).

Biological activity 
Verbascoside has an antimicrobial activity, notably against Staphylococcus aureus. It can also have anti-inflammatory properties.

Although some in vitro genotoxicity of verbascoside has been reported on human lymphocytes with an involvement of PARP-1 and p53 proteins, subsequent in vivo tests reported no genotoxicity for high dosage oral administration. It is a protein kinase C inhibitor.

See also 
 Echinacoside

References 

Phenylpropanoid glycosides
Phenylethanoids